The men's eight event was a rowing event conducted as part of the 1964 Summer Olympics programme. It was held from 12 to 15 October at the Toda Rowing Course. There were 14 boats (126 competitors) from 14 nations, with each nation limited to a single boat in the event. The event was won by the United States, returning the top of the podium after losing their eight-Games winning streak with a fifth-place finish in 1960; it was the nation's 11th overall victory in the men's eight. The defending champions, the United Team of Germany, took silver; the Germans defeated the United States in the opening round but lost the rematch in the final after the Americans advanced through the repechage. Czechoslovakia repeated as bronze medalists.

Background

This was the 14th appearance of the event. Rowing had been on the programme in 1896 but was cancelled due to bad weather. The men's eight has been held every time that rowing has been contested, beginning in 1900.

The United States was the dominant nation in the event, with the nation winning eight Olympic straight men's eight competitions from 1920 to 1956 before a surprise fifth-place finish in 1960. This time, the Americans were represented by the Vesper Boat Club. Germany had risen as a power as well—the United Team was the reigning Olympic gold medalist and West Germany had taken silver at the 1961 European Rowing Championships, gold at the 1962 World Rowing Championships, and gold at the 1963 European Rowing Championships. Other significant contenders included Canada (the 1963 Pan American Games champions) and Australia (1962 British Empire and Commonwealth Games winners).

Cuba, Egypt, and South Korea each made their debut in the event. Canada and the United States each made their 12th appearance, tied for most among nations to that point.

Competition format

The "eight" event featured nine-person boats, with eight rowers and a coxswain. It was a sweep rowing event, with the rowers each having one oar (and thus each rowing on one side). This rowing competition consisted of two main rounds (semifinals and finals), as well as a repechage round that allowed teams that did not win their heats to advance to the final. The competition introduced the consolation or "B" final, for ranking boats 7 through 12. The course used the 2000 metres distance that became the Olympic standard in 1912 (with the exception of 1948).

 Semifinals: Three heats. With 14 boats entered, there were four or five boats per heat. The winner of each heat (3 boats) advanced directly to the "A" final; all other boats (11 total) went to the repechage.
 Repechage: Three heats. With 11 boats racing in but not winning their initial heats, there were three or four boats per repechage heat. The top boat in each repechage heat (3 boats) advanced to the "A" final, the 2nd and 3rd place boats in each heat (6 boats) went to the "B" final (out of medal contention), and the remaining 2 boats were eliminated.
 Finals: The "A" final consisted of the six boats that had won either the semifinal heats or the repechage heats, competing for the medals and 4th through 6th place. The "B" final had the 2nd and 3rd place finishers from the repechage heats; they competed for 7th through 12th place.

Schedule

All times are Japan Standard Time (UTC+9)

Results

Semifinals

The top crew in each heat advanced to the final, with all others sent to the repechages.

Semifinal 1

Semifinal 2

Semifinal 3

Repechages

The top finisher in each of the three repechages joined the finalists. The second and third-place finishers competed in a consolation final for 7th-12th places. All other crews were eliminated.

Repechage heat 1

Repechage heat 2

Repechage heat 3

Consolation final

The consolation final determined places from 7th to 12th.

Final

References

Sources
 

Rowing at the 1964 Summer Olympics